William Ling may refer to:
 William Ling (cricketer) (1891–1960), South African cricketer
 William Ling (referee) (1908–1984), English football referee